Palkaneh (also Romanized as Palkāneh) is a village in Osmanvand Rural District, Firuzabad District, Kermanshah County, Kermanshah Province, Iran. At the 2006 census, its population was 117, in 24 families.

References 

Populated places in Kermanshah County